Johannes Petrus Adrianus "Hans" Gruijters (30 June 1931 – 17 April 2005) was a Dutch politician and co-founder of the Democrats 66 (D66) party and journalist.

Biography
Hans Gruijters studied psychology and political and social sciences at the University of Amsterdam. In 1954 he received a master's degree in psychology. After that he became the executive secretary with a textile company in Helmond. Later he was a joint proprietor of various companies in hotel and catering industry in Amsterdam. From 1960 to 1967 he ran the foreign affairs section of the Dutch daily newspaper Algemeen Handelsblad. From 1971 to 1973 he was the main editor of the VNU, a Dutch media conglomerate.

As a politician Gruijters was an active member of the VVD. As of 1959 he acted as the chairman of the Amsterdam's JOVD. From November 1962 until 21 March 1966 he was VVD's representative in the Amsterdam's city council. After a conflict which had been provoked by his decision not to attend the wedding ceremony of Princess Beatrix and Claus von Amsberg he left the VVD. He thought that the marriage would not contribute to the social role that the royal house should play in society.

Together with Hans van Mierlo he founded D66 in 1966. From 7 July 1970 to 1971 he was a member of the Provincial Council of North Holland. As of 7 December 1972 until 11 May 1973 he was a member of the Dutch House of Representatives. From 11 May 1973 until 19 December 1977 he was a minister of public housing and environmental planning in the cabinet of Den Uyl. From 1980 until his retirement in 1996 he was mayor of Lelystad. In 2004 he left the D66 as he felt no longer to be welcome there.

References

External links

Official
  Drs. J.P.A. (Hans) Gruijters Parlement & Politiek

1931 births
2005 deaths
Anti-monarchists
Democrats 66 politicians
Dutch atheists
Dutch former Christians
Journalists from Amsterdam
Dutch magazine editors
Dutch newspaper editors
Dutch political party founders
Dutch political philosophers
Dutch political writers
Dutch republicans
Former Roman Catholics
Mayors in Flevoland
Members of the House of Representatives (Netherlands)
Members of the Provincial Council of North Holland
Ministers of Housing and Spatial Planning of the Netherlands
Municipal councillors of Amsterdam
University of Amsterdam alumni
People from Lelystad
People from Helmond
20th-century Dutch businesspeople
20th-century Dutch male writers
20th-century Dutch politicians
20th-century Dutch journalists